Dwarf cherry as a name has been used for at least three species of small cherry trees:
Prunus cerasus
Prunus fruticosa
 Prunus pumila

An unrelated Australian tree with cherry-like fruit:
Exocarpus strictus

Cultivars of the sour cherry Prunus cerasus that are grafted onto dwarfing rootstocks.